Tomonotus is a genus of band-winged grasshoppers in the family Acrididae. There are at least two described species in Tomonotus.

Species
These two species belong to the genus Tomonotus:
 Tomonotus ferruginosus Bruner, 1905 (oak-leaf grasshopper)
 Tomonotus mexicanus Saussure, 1861 (Mexican oak-leaf grasshopper)

References

Further reading

 
 

Oedipodinae
Articles created by Qbugbot